Jerzy Derkacz (1950 – 10 November 2020) was a Polish politician who served as a Senator.

References

1950 births
2020 deaths
Polish politicians